The Liverpool, St Helens and South Lancashire Railway, was formed in 1889, but no services ran until 1895 and then only freight. Passenger services did not start until 1900. It incorporated the St Helens and Wigan Junction Railway.  It was taken over by the Great Central Railway in 1906.

History
The Railway was incorporated by Acts of Parliament in 1885-86 to enable the construction of a line from St Helens to Lowton (eight miles) and St Helens to Liverpool (ten miles). The lines had share capital of £210,000 and £340,000 respectively. The first sod was cut on 25 January 1888 by the Earl of Derby on the site of what became St Helens Central railway station. In July 1889 an Act of Parliament extended the completion time until July 1893. The opening ceremony took place on 2 January 1900.

The original intention was to connect to the Cheshire Lines Committee North Liverpool Extension Line at Fazakerley junction, to form a route to Huskisson Dock and Southport, but nothing ever came of the scheme west of St Helens.

Henry Seton-Karr was chairman of the railway at its opening.

Route
The line ran from St Helens Central (GCR) railway station to Lowton St Mary's.

Closure
The line closed to passengers in 1952. It was reduced in stages as freight traffic ebbed and flowed. The key milestones were:

 1965 line closed and lifted west of Lowton Metals, Ashton (inclusive).
 1968 line reinstated west of Lowton Metals to serve a new oil depot at Haydock
 1968 new "Haydock Branch Curve" built to connect the line to the WCML north of Golborne
 1968 line east of the new connection closed and lifted (the bridge over the WCML was removed in 1971)
 1975 passenger trains ran to five race meetings, using Ashton station, experiment not repeated 
 1983 Haydock oil depot traffic lost to road, line cut back to Lowton Metals, Haydock.
 1987 Lowton Metals ceased trading, line cut back to Golborne Colliery headshunt
 1987 Kelbit opened rail-served business at Edge Green, using trackbed of Edge Green Colliery branch
 1989 Golborne Colliery closed, line cut back to headshunt for the Kelbit traffic
 after 2000 the Kelbit site was taken over by Hanson as their "Ashton" plant
In 2011 the site was purchased by PF Jones Ltd and began work to restore the Kelbit rail line

In 2015 very occasional trains still served the Hanson plant.

On 7 March 2015 an enthusiasts' excursion titled "Sabrina's Tea Train" traversed the line.

A quarter-mile headshunt which ends at bufferstops approx 50 yards east of Bridge 13 over Edge Green Lane is the sole remaining section of the original route in use.

Re-Opening 
After purchasing the land surrounding the line at Edge Green in 2011, PF Jones Ltd worked with Hansons to restore the Kelbit line off the Haydock Branch Curve. The Kelbit line re-opens in 2018 and will be used by Hanson's to transfer raw materials from Shap Quarry, Cumbria to distribute across the north west.

Between and Golborne and Glazebrook High Speed 2 will use an alignment similar to the disused line in Phase 2b.

References

Sources

External links
Haydock Branch Jct and Kelbit via Wigan World

Historic transport in Merseyside
Pre-grouping British railway companies
Great Central Railway
Closed railway lines in North West England
Railway companies established in 1889
Railway lines opened in 1895
Railway companies disestablished in 1906
1889 establishments in England
British companies established in 1889